Steve Papermaster (born September 27, 1958) is an American entrepreneur, health and technology innovator, and global speaker. He is Chairman and CEO of Nano, a company focused on dramatically accelerating the development of cures for global health threats.  

Papermaster was appointed (2001-2009) as a Senior Advisor by President George W. Bush to serve on the United States President's Council of Advisors on Science and Technology (PCAST). Under President Bush, he also helped lead the Human Genome Project, the National Nanotechnology Initiative, served as a member of the China-US Strategic Economic Dialogue(SED), and is currently co-Chairperson of the Joint US-China Collaboration on Clean Energy (JUCCCE).

He was also the founder and CEO, board member and/or lead investor in technology, healthcare and biotechnology companies which achieved successful IPO's and/or merger and acquisition transactions. Papermaster has also served as CEO of Powershift Ventures.

References

American chief executives
Living people
1958 births